Carlos Magno (born 29 May 1995) is a football player who currently plays as midfielder for Pro Liga de Timor Leste club S.E. Gleno and Timor-Leste national football team.

International career
Carlos made his senior international debut is in 1-1 draw against Palestine national football team in the 2018 FIFA World Cup qualification on 8 October 2015 .

References

1997 births
Living people
East Timorese footballers
Timor-Leste international footballers
Association football midfielders
Footballers at the 2014 Asian Games
Asian Games competitors for East Timor